Erand Hoxha (born 25 April 1985) is an Albanian football player who currently plays as a defender for Korabi Peshkopi in the Albanian First Division.

Honours 
Besa Kavajë
 Albanian Cup (1): 2009–10

References

1985 births
Living people
Footballers from Kavajë
Albanian footballers
Association football defenders
Besa Kavajë players
KF Elbasani players
KF Teuta Durrës players
KF Korabi Peshkopi players
Kategoria Superiore players
Kategoria e Parë players